The Perfect Family is a 2021 Spanish comedy film directed by Arantxa Echevarría and written by Olatz Arroyo. The cast features Belén Rueda, José Coronado, Gonzalo de Castro, Pepa Aniorte, Carolina Yuste, Gonzalo Ramos, Jesús Vidal and Lalo Tenorio.

Plot 
The plot features the clash between a well-off family and a working-class family in the wake of an unexpected wedding between Pablo and Sara set to link both families, putting the world of Lucía (the privileged groom's mother) upside down.

Cast

Production 
The film was directed by Arantxa Echevarría whereas the screenplay was penned by Olatz Arroyo. Produced by Lazona Producciones, Atresmedia Cine and The Snake Films AIE, with the participation of Atresmedia and Canal Cosmopolitan Iberia and funding from the ICAA, it was shot in 2020 in locations of Madrid, Rascafría, Guadarrama and Brihuega. Shooting wrapped in Madrid after seven weeks by October 2020.

Release 
The film was theatrically released in Spain on 3 December 2021 by Universal Pictures International Spain.

Reception 
Reviewing for Cinemanía, Rubén Romero Santos gave the film 3 out of 5 stars, considering that, some plot licenses notwithstanding, it is an "estimable comedy about female empowerment" with the bonus of a steadycam managed with a "virtuosity" unusual in that sort of films.

Raquel Hernández Luján of HobbyConsolas gave it 72 points ("good"), deeming it to be a "fun film", praising the developments around Rueda's character, while considering that some secondary characters could have been removed.

In El Periódico de Catalunya, Beatriz Martínez rated the film with 3 out of 5 stars, deeming it to be a "competent" mainstream product which, commonplaces and plot cliches notwithstanding, is endowed with a sensibility removed from conventionalisms when approaching the characters, particularly the female ones.

Miguel Anxo Fernández of La Voz de Galicia highlighted Rueda's performance, also writing that the film confirms director Arantxa Echevarría as a consolidated value, while noting that the comedy features a tendency to absurdity which may put viewers off at certain moments, reasoning that a degree of "restraint" would have benefited the film.

See also 
 List of Spanish films of 2021

References

External links 
 

2021 films
2021 comedy films
2020s Spanish films
2020s Spanish-language films
Atresmedia Cine films
Films about families
Films about weddings
Films shot in Madrid
Films shot in the province of Guadalajara
Spanish comedy films